Allwinner Technology Co., Ltd is a fabless semiconductor company that designs mixed-signal systems on a chip (SoC). The company is headquartered in Zhuhai, Guangdong, China. It has a sales and technical support office in Shenzhen, Guangdong, and logistics operations in Hong Kong.

Since its founding in 2007, Allwinner has released over fifteen SoC processors for use in Android-based tablets, as well as in smartphones, over-the-air OTT boxes, video camera systems, car DVRs, and car media players.

In 2012 and 2013, Allwinner was the number one supplier in terms of unit shipments of application processors for Android tablets worldwide.
According to DigiTimes, in Q4 2013 Allwinner lost its number one position in terms of unit shipments to the Chinese market to Rockchip. For Q2 2014, Allwinner was reported by DigiTimes to be the third largest supplier to the Chinese market after Rockchip and MediaTek. DigiTimes has also projected that Allwinner will fall to the number four position in Q4 2014, being passed by Intel, as Allwinner's unit shipments continue to decline.

Product Lines

A-Series 

A series processors are used for mobile applications, mainly referring to tablet application.

A1x family 

In 2011, the company became an ARM processor licensee, and subsequently announced a series of ARM Cortex-A8 powered mobile application processors, including A10, A13 and A10s, which were used in numerous tablets, and also in PC-on-a-stick and media center devices. They have also been adopted in free hardware projects like the Cubieboard development board.

A2x and A3x family

In December 2012, Allwinner announced the availability of two ARM Cortex-A7 MPCore powered products, the dual-core Allwinner A20 and quad-core Allwinner A31. Production of the A31 started in September 2012 and end products, mostly high-end tablets from Chinese manufacturers, appeared on the market in early 2013, including the Onda V972. Allwinner was the first to make this ARM processor core available in mass production.

In March 2013, Allwinner launched its quad-core Phablet processor A31s. Based on quad-core cortex-A7 CPU architecture, this processor allows 3G, 2G, LTE, WIFI, BT, FM, GPS, AGPS and NFC using a minimum of external components.

In October, 2013, Allwinner released its second dual-core A23, touted to be "The most efficient dual core processor" for tablets. The A23's CPU frequency was intended to run up to 1.5 GHz.

In June, 2014, Allwinner announced the A33 quad-core SoC that is pin compatible with Allwinner's A23. The new SoC features four Cortex-A7 cores with 256 KB L1 cache, 512 KB L2 cache and a Mali-400 MP2 GPU. A new feature is the support of the OpenMAX API. Allwinner has positioned the A33 for entry-level tablets, targeting quad-core tablets priced from $30 to $60, and in July 2014 announced that it had started mass production of the chip, which would supposedly sell for as low as $4 per unit.

A5x family 
In April 2019, Allwinner announced the A50 28 nm quad-core SoC. The A50 features four Cortex-A7 cores running up to 1.8 GHz with 512 KB L2 cache and a Mali-400 MP2 GPU.

A6x family 
In June 2017, Allwinner announced the A63 28 nm quad-core SoC at APC 2017 Conference. The A63 features four Cortex-A53 cores running up to 1.8 GHz with 512 KB L2 cache and a Mali-T760 MP2 GPU with OpenGL ES 3.2 support. VPU with 4K/6K VP9, H.265, and H.264 4K @ 30fps video decoder and H.264 HP encoder 1080P@30fps

A8x family 

In October 2013, Allwinner disclosed its upcoming octa-core A80 SoC, featuring four high-performance ARM Cortex-A15 and four efficient ARM Cortex-A7 CPU cores in a big.LITTLE configuration.

On June 30, 2014, Chinese brand Onda officially released its octa-core Onda V989 tablet, which is based on Allwinner A80. This is the first Allwinner A80-based tablet that is available to consumers, priced at CNY 1099 (~US$177).

In September 2014, Allwinner announced the Allwinner A83T, an octa-core tablet processor that packs eight highly energy-efficient Cortex-A7 cores that can run simultaneously at up to around 2.0 GHz. It also includes a PowerVR GPU. The first tablet with the chip was expected to hit the market in Q4 2014.

A10x/20x/30x family 
In April 2019, Allwinner announced their roadmap for 2019 to 2020 feature the A100, A200, A300 and A301 SoC. The Allwinner A200 was described as “AI blessing, computational power”.

F-Series 

F series are processors based on Allwinner's melis OS, mainly used in smart video radios, video MP5, etc.

From 2007 to 2011, Allwinner introduced its F-series processors, including the F10, F13, F18, F20, F1E200, F1C100, and F20. This series runs Allwinner's in-house operating system Melis2.0, which is now mainly used in vehicle multimedia systems, E-ink readers, video intercom systems, and so on.

Sega's Game Gear Micro uses the F1C200S as main CPU.

H-Series 

The H-series, introduced in 2014, are integrated application processors primarily targeted at OTT set-top box applications e.g. HDMI mini PCs, gaming boxes, etc.;

Allwinner has launched the A80 octa-core OTT box solution, targeting at high-end OTT box market, and launched the Allwinner H8 octa-core processor for mid-range OTT boxes, and most recently launched the quad-core Allwinner H3 targeting the US$35 - $50 OTT box market.

R-Series 

The R (“Real-Time") Series Chip is designed for low power applications where timing is critical and must be done at the edge rather than in the fog or cloud.  The chip also has built in redundancies to meet industrial and automotive standards for processing.

The R Series Chip has been applicable to a number of different industries including Industrial Automation, Safe PLCs, Power Generation and Distribution, Healthcare and Automotive Technology. The technology, specifically the R16 Chip, has also been utilised for robotic vacuums, Nintendo Classic Mini systems and smart speakers resulting from a longterm partnership with the Cogobuy Group's subsidiary IngDan.

Cogobuy's preparatory K-system was used as the basis to add integrated SLAM modules with Allwinner chip's.   The technical advantages and patents Cogobuy held allowed for chip localisation of edge computing required for the AI room mapping and cleaning.  The R40 and R16 technology has been implemented on a number of Banana Pi models.  The R8 Chip was also used for “The World’s First Nine Dollar Computer” Kickstarter project in 2015.

V-Series

The V-Series are video encoding processor targeting applications such as smart DVR, IP camera and smart home applications. It is similar to the A series SoC, but adds support for functions such as digital watermarking, motion detection and video scaling, as well as a CBR/VBR bit rate control mode.

Chipset specifications 
The Allwinner SoC family includes A-series, which is intended for Android OS, and F-series, which is intended for the company's self-developed Melis operating system.

The A-Series, including the A10, A20 and A31 SoCs,  have a proprietary in-house designed multimedia co-processing DSP (Digital Signal Processing) processor technology for hardware accelerated video, image, and audio decoding, called CedarX (with subprocessing called "CedarV" for video decoding and "CedarA" for audio decoding), able to decode 2160p 2D and 1080p 3D video. The main disadvantages with CedarX technology and associated libraries is that Allwinner's own CedarX proprietary libraries have no clear usage license, so even if the source code for some versions is available the terms-of-use is unknown in open source software, and there is no glue code for any other multimedia frameworks on Linux systems that could be used as a middle-ware, like for example OpenMAX or VAAPI.

A-Series 

The A-series are integrated application processors primarily targeting tablets as well as targeting mini PCs, development boards and TV boxes.

H-Series 
The H-series, introduced in 2014, are primarily targeted at OTT set-top box applications.

F-Series

R-Series

T-Series

Allwinner processor ecosystem 

Allwinner Technology cooperates with around ten independent design houses (IDHs) based in Shenzhen, China, who develop solutions based on Allwinner processors. They include iNet Technology, Worldchip Digital Technology, Sochip Technology, Topwise Communication, ChipHD Technology, Highcharacter Science and Technology, WITS Technology, Ococci Technology, Next Huawen Technology, and Qi Hao Digital Technology.

Apart from the white-box market, Allwinner processors can also be found in many brand products, including HP, MSI, ZTE, NOOX, GoTab, Skyworth, MeLE, Polaroid, Micromax, Archos, Texet, Ainol, Onda, Ramos, Teclast, Ployer, Readboy, Noah, RF, Bmorn, Apical, Astro Queo, etc.

Free and open-source software support 
Due to the low price of the A10 SoC, the fact that it has a special rescue mode, and the early availability of U-Boot and Linux kernel source (through several device makers), the Allwinner SoCs have been popular among open-source software developers. Since at least 2012 the linux-sunxi community has been one of the most active ARM SoC communities, and the slightly older hardware has only very minimal dependence on firmware or blobs.

Since 2014 Allwinner is also an official member of the Linaro group, a nonprofit engineering consortium aimed at developing open-source software for the ARM architecture. However, it has been noted that most of the contributions that Allwinner has made to the Linaro group has been in the form of binary blobs, which is in clear violation of the GNU GPL license that the Linux kernel uses.

Android 5.0 Lollipop support

In December 2014, Allwinner released its Android 5.0 SDK for Allwinner A33 quad-core solution.

Linux controversies

GPL controversy 
Allwinner has been accused multiple times of violating the GPL license by not providing Linux/Android kernel source code or U-Boot source, and by using LGPL-licensed code within their binary blobs, etc.

Backdoor controversy 

Allwinner has also been accused of including a backdoor in its published version of the Linux kernel. The backdoor allows any installed app to have full root access to the system. While this may be a remnant of debugging during the development process, it presents a significant security risk to all devices using the Allwinner provided kernel.

See also 
 Allwinner A1X
 Amlogic
 Actions Semiconductor
 Leadcore Technology
 MediaTek
 Nufront
 Rockchip
 UNISOC
 List of Qualcomm Snapdragon systems-on-chip
 Comparison of ARMv8-A cores
 Comparison of ARMv7-A cores

References

ARM architecture
Embedded microprocessors
Microprocessors made in China
Fabless semiconductor companies
Companies based in Zhuhai
Semiconductor companies of China
Chinese brands
Chinese companies established in 2007